Caduca albopunctata is a moth of the family Noctuidae first described by Francis Walker in 1857.

Distribution
It is found in Sri Lanka, the Indian subregion, Taiwan, Thailand, Sundaland and Japan's Iriomote Island and Ishigaki Island.

Description
The wings are dark blackish brown and fasciated with several series of small white spots.

Subspecies
Two subspecies are recognized.

Caduca albopunctata albopunctata Walker, 1857
Caduca albopunctata phronimus Rothschild, 1920

References

External links
Sweet Or Savoury? Adult Feeding Preferences of Lepidoptera Attracted to Banana and Prawn Baits in the Oriental Tropics

Moths of Asia
Moths described in 1857